This is a list of diplomatic missions in Cuba. At present, the capital city of Havana hosts 115 embassies.  Several other countries have ambassadors accredited from other regional capitals.  Its role as a promoter of Third World causes during the Cold War led to the development of close ties with many non-aligned and socialist-leaning countries around the globe, as evidenced by the presence in Havana of many embassies from financially poor and economically developing countries.

This listing excludes honorary consulates.

Embassies in Havana

Gallery of embassies

Non-resident embassies accredited to Cuba 

Resident in Ottawa, Canada:
 

  

 
 

Resident in New York City, United States of America:
 

 
 

 
 

 
 
 
 
 
 
 
 
 

Resident in Mexico City, Mexico:
 

 
 

 
 
 

Resident elsewhere:
 (Madrid)
 (Santo Domingo)
 (Brasilia)
 (Caracas)

Closed missions

See also
 Foreign relations of Cuba
 List of diplomatic missions of Cuba

Notes

References

Diplomatic Directory

 
Diplomatic
Cuba